Lumberjack Man is a 2015 American comedy slasher film, written and directed by Josh Bear. The film was part of the 2015 After Dark Films "8 Films to Die For" line-up.

Plot

Arriving at their annual camp retreat, the teens and staff of Good Friends Church Camp are unaware of the horror that awaits them. Near the camp grounds in an old abandoned log home an undead Lumber Jack has arisen. Armed with his axes, saw, a rolling griddle with giant flapjacks he begins to stalk and kill the teens using their blood for syrup to eat with his meal. While this goes on Dr. Peter Shirtcliff (Michael Madsen) tries to warn the head park ranger LuAnn Potts (Brina Palencia) of the terror awaiting the campers. She does not believe him as the story sounds too ridiculous to be true especially when he says it relates to the award winning Instant pancakes from J.T. Jeppson. Shirtcliff leaves to save the campers while LuAnn looking through old newspaper articles and police reports begins to believe there is something going on but is later attacked by the Lumberjack Man who nearly kills her by throwing an axe to her back, but retreats when she throws a cup of syrup at him her deputy was using earlier. 

Back at the camp the campers and staff are killed off one by one in the mess hall till only Faith, Reggie the cook, and counselor Doug (Adam Sessler) are left standing. Doug abandons the two to save himself but dies from being cut in half. Shirtcliff arrives to help and reveals the truth of the Lumberjack Man and Jeppson. Back in the 19th century, in the year of 1892, when Jeppson was in the woods hunting wild cats, he was lured by a strong aroma that led him to the Lumberjack Man. Originally, he was Nehemiah Easterday, a quiet and secluded man who every first Tuesday before Lent would cook his family’s secret pancake recipe as tradition. When he refused to share the recipe for profit, due to that he has vowed to take his family's secret recipe to the grave, Jeppson kills him by drowning him in his own syrup and steals the recipe in a stuffed ocelot invoking the wrath of Easterday turning him into a vengeful monster. Shirtcliff states he rises and kills everyone who enters his woods and once he finishes his pancakes before Lent morning he becomes more powerful till he’s become unstoppable. After finding him and his home the trio try to fight Easterday but he has already finished his breakfast and now is stronger. Faith after finding the missing barrel of syrup from the mess hall in his cabin covers herself with it revealing also she’s the descendant of Jeppson, taunting Easterday to attack she fights him to he’s finally vanquished ending his murder spree, with Shirtcliff, Reggie, and an injured LuAnn they hitch a ride to town leaving the camp and the Lumberjack Man’s memory behind.

Cast
 Brina Palencia as LuAnn Potts, the head ranger of Big Timber State Park
 Brandon Ford as Nehemiah Easterday / Lumberjack Man
 Ciara Flynn as Faith
 Alex Dobrenko as Jeff
 Chase Joliet as Kellenberger
 Jarrett King as Reggie
Michael Madsen as Dr. Peter Shirtcliff, a witness to the mass murders many years ago.
Andy San Dimas as Theresa, the Assistant Camp Director.
Christopher Sabat as Shep, a deputy ranger
 Jasmin Carina as Jacqueline
 Zachary Guerrero as Ernie
 Alyona Real as Stacey
 Athena Paxton as Courtney
 Raven Rockette as Kendra
 Moon Ray as Danielle
 David Nguyen as Raymond
 Tyler Mount as Trevor
 Troy Yingst as Logan
Adam Sessler as Doug, the Camp Director

Release
Prior to the release of the film, a viral marketing campaign was launched, which was reported by ShockTillYouDrop.com, now known as ComingSoon.net, and Internet personality and filmmaker James Rolfe. The marketing featured the sending of packages in the form of file boxes from the Shirtcliff Wellness Center, marked as classified by Dr. Peter Shirtcliff, a character in the film played by Michael Madsen. The packages contained a box of pancake batter, a torn shirt cloth, a trophy for a 1919 flapjack festival, a newspaper clipping about a mass murder incident taking place in 1919, and promotional photos.

The film premiered in Los Angeles, California on August 11, 2015 and in theaters on October 16, 2015.

Reception

Dread Central's Ari Drew gave the film three stars, considering the film fun but lacking in writing and technical capabilities. Slasher.Club writer McConnaughay condemned Lumberjack Man as a "nonsensical, ultimately bad film with occasional charm dispelled by terrible characters."

References

External links
 
 
 

2015 films
2015 comedy horror films
2015 independent films
2010s slasher films
American comedy horror films
American independent films
American slasher films
Backwoods slasher films
Films shot in Texas
Slasher comedy films
2010s English-language films
2010s American films